Yala sub county is one of the administrative units of Siaya County, western Kenya. It is located 42 kilometres northwest of Kisumu, Kenya's third largest city.  In 2009, it had a population of 25,769 and Yala town had a population of 2,438.

Yala is served by a railway station, the Kisumu-Busia highway, Ndanu water treatment works, a jaggery (formerly Yala White Sugar Company) and Odera Akang'o campus, a constituent college of Maseno university.

Yala is home to one of Kenya's pioneer learning institutions, St. Mary's School, Yala which was started by the Mill hill fathers in 1927. It is also served by the Maliera Boys Secondary School.

See also 
 Nyamninia
 Railway stations in Kenya

References 

Siaya County
Populated places in Nyanza Province